Cruzeiro Esporte Clube, known simply as Cruzeiro, is a Brazilian sports club based in Belo Horizonte, Minas Gerais. Although they compete in a number of different sports, Cruzeiro is mostly known for its association football team. It plays in the Campeonato Brasileiro Série A, the top tier of the Brazilian football league system, as well as in the Campeonato Mineiro, the state of Minas Gerais's premier state league.

The club was founded on 2 January 1921, by sportsmen from the Italian colony of Belo Horizonte as Palestra Itália. As a result of the Second World War, the Brazilian federal government banned the use of any symbols referring to the Axis powers in 1942. The club board members rebaptized the club with the name of a leading national symbol: the Cruzeiro do Sul's constellation. Cruzeiro play their home games at the Mineirão stadium, which currently holds up to 62,547 spectators. Cruzeiro's regular kit colors are blue shirts and white shorts with white socks.

Cruzeiro is one of Brazil's most successful clubs. It won the Campeonato Brasileiro Série A for the first time in 1966, after defeating Santos' Os Santásticos in the final series. Cruzeiro has won the Brasileirão again in 2003, 2013 and 2014, obtaining the best campaign in the present format of the competition. Cruzeiro has also won record six Copa do Brasil titles and the Campeonato Mineiro 39 times. Cruzeiro won the defunct state competitions Taça Minas Gerais five times, the Copa dos Campeões Mineiros twice, Copa Sul Minas twice, the Torneio Início 10 times and the Supercampeonato Mineiro once. A Raposa also obtained many international laurels such as two Copa Libertadores, two Supercopa Libertadores, one Recopa Sudamericana, one Copa de Oro and one Copa Master de Supercopa. Cruzeiro is one of the two Brazilian clubs to complete the Domestic Treble, a feat accomplished in 2003 after winning the Campeonato Mineiro, the 2003 Copa do Brasil and the 2003 Brasileirão.

Cruzeiro hold a long-standing rivalry against Atlético Mineiro. It has contributed many key and famous players towards Brazil's FIFA World Cup squads such as Piazza, Tostão, Nelinho, Ronaldo, Luisão, Alex, Maicon, Cris, Jairzinho, Rivaldo and Edílson among so many others.

History
Cruzeiro's history is traced back to the Italian community living in Belo Horizonte, a city where already some Italian immigrants lived and their desire to set up a football club. Similar to the Italians of São Paulo (who founded Palestra Itália, now known as Palmeiras) the people of Belo Horizonte wanted the Italian colonies in Minas Gerais to have its own club as well.

In the sporting goods and footwear Augustine Ranieri's factory, located on the street of Caetés, it was decided the foundation of the club should tackle the three major capital: Atlético Mineiro, America-MG and Yale. Was born at that moment, the Società Sportiva Palestra Italia, established on 2 January 1921.

The meeting was attended by 95 founders present the shield and uniform that made reference to the Italian colors, and whose SSPI description would be recorded in the center shell. Another decision was that only members of the Italian colony could wear the shirt. Aurelio Noce was elected the first President.

The Palestra Italia emerged as the representative of the Italian colony. And is characterized as a team of Italian descent, Palestra also stood out by having elements of the Belo Horizonte working class, unlike Atlético and América, who had their consisting squad of college students coming from influential and wealthy families of the city.

The idea of the club being created took a big step when Yale, a sports team from the city, went through an administrative crisis. When some players left Yale over a dispute (Yale, which itself had connections to the Italian community), some went on to found the all Italian, Sociedade Esportiva Palestra Itália of Belo Horizonte. Until 1925 the club would only allow Italian men to participate, despite other teams in the nation accepting people of all skin colors and ethnicities.

Palestra debuted in the Prado Mineiro Stadium with a 2–0 win in a friendly on 3 April 1921, against a combination from Nova Lima. The Nova Lima team united players from two teams from the city: Villa Nova, and Palmeiras, another team form Nova Lima. However, the first official match of Palestra was in a 3–0 win over future archrivals Clube Atlético Mineiro.
In January 1942, Brazil entered World War II and a decree of the federal government forbade the use of terms from enemy nations in entities, institutions, establishments, etc. With this, the Italian name was removed and the club could no longer call themselves Palestra Italia. The name was changed to Sociedade Esportiva Palestra Mineiro.

Around six months later, the president Ennes Cyro Poni called a general assembly for 7 October and suggested the name Ypiranga. Between 3 and 7 October, the local media published the new name thinking it would be approved. In assembly, the counselors and associates kept professional system and approved changing club's name and colors. Yale and Ypiranga were suggested, but Cruzeiro Esporte Clube was chosen to honor the biggest symbol of Brazil, the constellation of Crux. The idea was from Oswaldo Pinto Coelho. However, the club kept playing as "Palestra Mineiro" until 1943, when the local Federation approved the new statutes. The approved colors were blue and white, chosen as a compromise to appease the Italian factions within the club management, as it was both representative of the Brazilian flag and the Italian football national team (blue is the color of House of Savoy, who ruled Italy from 1861 to 1946).

With the inauguration of the Mineirão in 1965, Cruzeiro entered one of the most successful periods in its history, in which the club won five Campeonato Mineiro titles in a row, and went on to win its first national title, the 1966 Taça Brasil (the highest honor in Brazilian football at that time) beating Santos of Pelé in the final. Cruzeiro won the first leg 6–2 at the Mineirão, and the second leg 3–2 in São Paulo. In the 1974 Campeonato Brasileiro Série A Cruzeiro were runner-up for the first time, after losing to Vasco in the finals. Later in 1975, Cruzeiro were runner-up in the Campeonato Brasileiro again, this time losing to Internacional. In 1976, Cruzeiro won its first Copa Libertadores de América, over River Plate of Argentina. Cruzeiro went on to be runners-up of the same competition in 1977, being defeated in the finals by Boca Juniors, also of Argentina. After winning the 1976 Copa Libertadores, they participated in the 1976 Intercontinental Cup, now renamed the FIFA Club World Championship, for the first time and tied Bayern Munich 0–0 at the Mineirão, but lost 2–0 to Bayern in the Olympiastadion.

After tasting success in the 1960s and 1970s, Cruzeiro entered a dark period in the 1980s. With the exception of a couple of Campeonato Mineiro wins, the club won no other championships in the 1980s, and had its worst performances in the Campeonato Brasileiro, 33rd in 1984 and 29th in 1985. The 1980s was the only decade Cruzeiro did not participate once in the Copa Libertadores since the tournament's creation in 1960. The club were invited to Europe in 1988 by Scottish side Celtic to play a friendly as part of the Glasgow club's centenary celebrations.

In the 1990s a new era began, and a 15-year sequence of at least one title per year was initiated. This included six of the club's seven international championships and a Campeonato Brasileiro (2003). In December 2010 the CBF (the governing body of Brazilian football) also recognized Cruzeiro as Brazilian champion of 1966, for having beaten Santos of Pelé: 6–2 in Belo Horizonte and 2–3 in São Paulo. The club's biggest exploit in the 21st century happened when it won the Campeonato Brasileiro Série A. With 100 points earned during the season, and just over 100 goals scored in 46 matches, it was one of the most successful campaigns ever by a club in a Brazilian championship. In 2003, besides winning the Campeonato Brasileiro Série A, Cruzeiro also won the Copa do Brasil and the Campeonato Mineiro, to become the only Brazilian team to win the triple crown.

From 2003 to 2012 Cruzeiro have only won one major tournament (four times): the Campeonato Mineiro (2004, 2006, 2008, 2009). However, the club finished in the top five of the Campeonato Brasileiro in 2007, 2008, 2009 and 2010, guaranteeing a spot in the Copa Libertadores for four consecutive years (2008, 2009, 2010 and 2011). In 2010, after a great campaign in the Campeonato Brasileiro Serie A, Cruzeiro took the second place and qualified for the Copa Libertadores da America for 2011. Cruzeiro's biggest success in recent years was reaching the finals of the 2009 Copa Libertadores, but they lost to Estudiantes de La Plata 2–1. After a disastrous 2011 season, escaping relegation only in the last round after a triumphant 6–1 against arch-rival Atlético, Gilvan Tavares became president for the 2012-2013-2014 triennium. 2012 was slightly better than 2011, but still Cruzeiro won no titles. In 2013 Cruzeiro lost Campeonato Mineiro again, despite displaying a good game against smaller clubs. Copa do Brasil started promising but Cruzeiro was knocked out by future champion Flamengo in the quarterfinals. After the elimination Cruzeiro went all in to Campeonato Brasileiro and was crowned champion for the third time, this time four rounds before the championship ended, playing an offensive and intense game that led many, including press and runners-up, to attribute the title many rounds before the mathematical confirmation. Cruzeiro's 2014 season was even more successful. It started with Cruzeiro winning the Campeonato Mineiro without losing a single match in the whole competition. In the Copa Libertadores da America, Cruzeiro was knocked out, in the quarter finals, by future champion San Lorenzo de Almagro, being the last remaining Brazilian team in the competition. This loss did not prevent Cruzeiro to lead the Campeonato Brasileiro for almost the whole competition, being crowned champion for the fourth time and becoming the second team not from Rio de Janeiro nor Sao Paulo to win the Campeonato Brasileiro twice in a row. Cruzeiro also got to the final of the Copa do Brasil, but lost both matches to rival Atlético Mineiro.

Symbols

Colors

When Cruzeiro was still known as Palestra Italia, the home shirt colour was green. The first home kit was an improvised dark green shirt, with white shorts and green stockings. Cruzeiro used this kit in their first professional game on 3 April 1921, in the Prado Mineiro Stadium, with a 2–0 win over the Villa Nova/Palmeiras combined team, of Nova Lima. In 1928 the shirt became a lighter tone of green, with a white neck design and red cuffs. The shorts continued to be white, but the green stockings now had red and white details, similar to that of the Italian flag. This particular uniform was used up until 1940. The light green color of the shirt would later give the team the nickname "periquito", Portuguese for parakeet. In 1940 there was a big change to the shirt. The shirt began to feature horizontal stripes, with the club crest in the center. This was the shirt used to win the 1940 Campeonato da Cidade – now known as the Campeonto Mineiro – after the club had been unable to win the tournament for ten years. The club also began to be called "tricolor" instead of "periquito".

In 1942 Cruzeiro played one game under the name Ypiranga, and for this game a blue shirt with a central horizontal stripe was used. In 1943 Cruzeiro played its first game under its current name. The shirt used then was an all blue shirt with a large white v-neck (scapular) design. The shorts and stockings were white. In 1950, due to bad stadium lighting, Cruzeiro began to use an all-white shirt during night games. The shirt, which featured blue details and blue shorts and white stockings, was used for nine years. In 1956, Cruzeiro used, for a short while, a new shirt that was made up of white and blue horizontal stripes. The uniform was not used in many games. There was a change to the shirt in 1959; the shirt became all blue, a design that would influence later shirts. In the 1959 shirt, instead of using its normal crest Cruzeiro simply used the five stars, in the crest, loose on the shirt. The shirt made its debut in the Estádio dos Tecelões, in a friendly match against Renascença, on 19 September.

In 1984 Cruzeiro had the first ever company logo on its shirt; it was the shirt manufacturer's logo, which was Topper. In the same year Cruzeiro had its first shirt sponsor, Medradao. Medradao was only used on the away shirts

Crest

The first Palestra Itália crest was a rhombus whose top half was red and bottom half was green (both colors of the Italian flag). In the center of the crest was a white circle with the letters P and I inside it. The following year, 1922, the club's crest maintained its rhombus shape, but was now completely white, with the letter P, S and I, inscribed within it in green. In 1923, the crest lost its rhombus shape and instead just had the green letters S, P and I. From 1928 to 1939 the crest was identical to the first crest in 1921. Just one year later the crest became a little different: the top half was green and the bottom half was red, similar to the crests from 1921 and 1929–1939, but instead of green letters in its center, it now had the letters S, P and I in yellow.

The crest introduced in 1940 would be the last for Palestra, because the club would soon become Cruzeiro. Cruzeiro's first crest was introduced in 1950 and was very simple: a blue circle, with a white border, inside of which were five white stars, positioned to look like the Southern Cross. This first crest was used for over nine years, until 1959. In 1959 the crest changed, now with a white border around the crest with the words "-CRUZEIRO ESPORTE CLUBE-BELO HORIZONTE" in blue. This version of the crest was used until 1996, making it the longest-used crest by Cruzeiro. In the same year, Cruzeiro removed BELO HORIZONTE from the crest; this format was used until 2005. In 2006 to honor its successful 2003 season, a crown was added on top of the crest, to symbolize the triple crown.

Cruzeiro has not always used its official crest on its shirt. In 1959, instead of using its crest, the club opted to simply put the five stars from the Southern Cross on its shirt. This was done until 2000, when the actual crest was again used. In 2002 and in part of 2003 the loose stars were used. Part way through 2003 a new shirt that contained the actual crest was introduced, but instead of just using the regular crest the shirt featured two Copa Libertadores trophies on top of the crest. In 2004 a similar design was used, but now featured a crown, symbolic of the Triple Crown on top of the two trophies. Since 2007 the club has used the "loose stars" design on home shirts. None of these designs actually became the official club crest.

Anthem

The club's anthem, Hino ao Campeão, was written by Jadir Ambrósio in 1966, in homage to the team of his heart. He never meant for it to become the official anthem, but when fans started hearing it they liked it enough to adapt it as the new anthem.

Kit suppliers and shirt sponsors

Mascot
Cartoonist Fernando Pieruccetti, more popularly known as "Mangabeira", created the club's mascot, a raposa (Portuguese for fox) in the 1940s, as he did for other football clubs from Minas Gerais state league. Mangabeira took inspiration from the club's ex-president, Mario Grosso. "He was a director who let no one trick him. He was sly, agile, intelligent and skillful like a fox." In the 2000s, Cruzeiro has made the Raposão (Big Fox) its biggest mascot, appearing at all home games and cheering with the crowd while wearing the club's colors. 
In 2010, Raposão won Rede Globo's Competição de Mascotes (Mascot Competition), held in their Sunday sports show Esporte Espetacular. The program united 20 mascots from the biggest Brazilian teams and had them competing in series of challenges. Raposão won all of the events and was crowned as Brazil's Best Mascot.

In 2012, Cruzeiro introduced a "junior mascot", named "Raposinho" (Little Fox), a smaller version of "Raposão".

Presidents

 Aurélio Noce – 1921–22
 Alberto Noce – 1923–24
 Américo Gasparini – 1925–26, 1928
 Antonio Falci – 1927, 1929–30
 Braz Pelegrino – 1927–28
 Lidio Lunardi – 1931–32
 José Viana de Souza – 1933
 Miguel Perrela – 1933–36
 Romeo de Paoli – 1936
 Osvaldo Pinto Coelho – 1936–40
 Ennes Cyro Poni – 1941–42
 João Fantoni – 1942
 Wilson Saliba – 1942
 Mario Torneli – 1942
 Mário Grosso – 1942–47
 Fernando Tamietti – 1947, 1950
 Antônio Cunha Lobo – 1947–49
 Antônio Alves Simões – 1949
 Manoel F. Campos – 1950
 Divino Ramos – 1951
 José Greco – 1952–53, 1955
 Wellington Armanelli – 1954
 José Francisco Lemos Filho – 1954
 Eduardo S. Bambirra – 1955–56
 Manoel A. de Carvalho – 1957–58
 Antonio Braz Lopes Pontes – 1959–60
 Felicio Brandi – 1961–82
 Carmine Furletti – 1983–84
 Benito Masci – 1985–90
 Salvador Masci – 1990
 César Masci – 1991–94
 Zezé Perrella – 1995–2002
 Alvimar de Oliveira Costa – 2003–08
 Zezé Perrella – 2009–11
 Gilvan Tavares – 2012–17
 Wagner Pires de Sá – 2018–19
 José Dalai Rocha – 2019–20
 Sérgio Santos Rodrigues – 2020–

Current squad

Youth players

Out on loan

First-team staff

Notable players

Former coaches

  Matturio Fabbi (1928–31)
  Rizzo (1932)
  Matturio Fabbi (1932–35)
  Nello Nicolai (1935–37)
  Ninão (1937)
  Matturio Fabbi (1938–39)
  Bengala (1939–43)
  Ninão (1943–44)
  Bengala (1944)
  Nello Nicolai (1946)
  Bengala (1946–47)
  Niginho (1948–49)
  Ricardo Diéz (1953)
  Niginho (1953–55)
  Bengala (1955–56)
  Ayrton Moreira (1957)
  Gérson dos Santos (1957)
  Danilo Alvim (1958)
  Gérson dos Santos (1958–59)
  Ninão (1959)
  Niginho (1959–61)
  Gérson dos Santos (1962)
  Niginho (1962–63)
  Ayrton Moreira (1964–67)
  Orlando Fantoni (1967–68)
  Hilton Chaves (1968–69)
  Gérson dos Santos (1969–70)
  Hilton Chaves (1970)
  Filpo Núñez (1970)
  Hilton Chaves (1970–71)
  Orlando Fantoni (1971–72)
  Yustrich (1972)
  Hilton Chaves (1972–75)
  Zezé Moreira (1975–77)
  Yustrich (1977)
  Aymoré Moreira (1977–78)
  Procópio (1978)
  Hilton Chaves (1979–80)
  Procópio (1981)
  Yustrich (1982)
  Orlando Fantoni (1983)
  Hilton Chaves (1983–84)
  Procópio (1986)
  Carlos Alberto Silva (1986–87)
  Jair Pereira (1987–88)
  Ênio Andrade (1989–90)
  Carbone (1990)
  Ênio Andrade (1991–92)
  Jair Pereira (1992)
  Pinheiro (1993)
  Carlos Alberto Silva (1993–94)
  Zé Maurício (1993–94)
  Ênio Andrade (1994)
  Palhinha (1994)
  Nelinho (1994)
  Ênio Andrade (1995)
  Jair Pereira (1995)
  Levir Culpi (1996)
  P. Autuori (1 March 1997–30 June 97)
  Levir Culpi (1998–99)
  Paulo Autuori (1999–00)
  Marco Aurélio (2000)
  Felipão (1 July 2000 – 30 June 2001)
  PC Carpegiani (1 May 2001 – 6 Aug 2001)
  Marco Aurélio (2001–02)
  Vanderlei Luxemburgo (2002–03)
  E. Leão (5 May 2004 – 29 July 2004)
  Marco Aurélio (2004)
  Levir Culpi (1 Jan 2005 – 30 June 2005)
  PC Gusmão (5 July 2005 – 14 Aug 2006)
  Oswaldo de Oliveira (2006)
  P. Autuori (4 Dec 2006 – 1 May 2007)
  D. Júnior (8 May 2007 – 2 Dec 2007)
  A. Batista (1 Jan 2008 – 3 June 2010)
  Cuca (8 June 2010 – 19 June 2011)
  J. Santana (20 June 2011 – 2 Sept 2011)
  E. Ávila (4 Sept 2011 – 25 Sept 2011)
  V. Mancini (26 Sept 2011 – 10 May 2012)
  Celso Roth (15 May 2012 – 2 Dec 2012)
  M. Oliveira (3 Dec 2012 – 2 June 2015)
  V. Luxemburgo (2 June 2015 – 31 Aug 2015)
  Mano Menezes (1 Sept 2015 – 6 Dec 2015)
  Deivid (10 Dec 2015 – 25 April 2016)
  Paulo Bento (11 May 2016 – 26 July 2016)
  Mano Menezes (27 July 2016 – 8 Aug 2019)
  Rogerio Ceni (13 Aug 2019 – 26 Sept 2019)
  Abel Braga (27 Sept 2019 – 29 Nov 2019)
  A. Batista (29 Nov 2019 – 15 Mar 2020)
  Enderson Moreira (18 Mar 2020 – 8 Sept 2020)
  Ney Franco (9 Sept 2020 – 11 Oct 2020)
  Felipão (15 Oct 2020 – 25 Jan 2021)
  Felipe Conceição (30 Jan 2021 – 9 Jun 2021)
  Mozart (10 Jun 2021 – 30 Jul 2021)
  V. Luxemburgo (3 August 2021 – 28 Dec 2021)
  Paulo Pezzolano (3 January 2022 – )

Records and statistics

Most appearances

Roberto Perfumo, with 138 matches, was the non-Brazilian with the most appearances for the club, this was recently changed however as Ariel Cabral was awarded this record with 200 appearances for the club.

The player with the most appearances for Cruzeiro is Fábio with a stunning record of 800 appearances, having been with the team since 2005, beating former midfielder Zé Carlos, with 619 appearances, between 1965 and 1977. In third place on that list is 1971's Bola de Ouro Winner, "The Prince" Dirceu Lopes, while the fourth place belongs to former Brazilian international and 1970 FIFA World Cup champion Wilson Piazza. The fifth overall player, and second goalkeeper with the most appearances for Cruzeiro is the notorious Raul Plassman, who played a total of 557 games with the team. The non-Brazilian with the most appearances for the club is the Argentine Roberto Perfumo who made 138 appearances for the club between 1971 and 1974.

Top goalscorers
Brazilian hall-of-famer and 1970 FIFA World Cup winner Tostão has scored the most goals for Cruzeiro, 249 between 1963 and 1972, having appeared on 378 matches for Cruzeiro (12th overall). He beats Dirceu Lopes by 25 goals on that list, which also has old-timer Niginho (207 goals) closing the top 3, being the only ones with over 200 goals for Cruzeiro. Ninão holds the record for goals scored in a single match: 10 in Cruzeiro's 14–0 win over Alves Nogueira during Campeonato da Cidade on 17 June 1928. Nelinho holds the record for most goals scored from penalties: 38; and the record for goals scored from fouls: 42. Walter Montillo's 39 goals make him the non-Brazilian with the most goals for Cruzeiro, a record that would belong to Bolivia national football team vice-captain and striker Marcelo Moreno with 48 goals or Spanish 1930's striker Fernando Carazo, with 44 goals, had they not become Brazilian nationals.

Honours

International
 Copa Libertadores de América (2): 1976, 1997
 Supercopa Libertadores (2): 1991, 1992
 Copa Ouro (1): 1995
 Recopa Sul-Americana (1): 1998
 Copa Master de Supercopa (1): 1995

National
 Campeonato Brasileiro Série A (4): 1966, 2003, 2013, 2014
 Copa do Brasil (6): 1993, 1996, 2000, 2003, 2017, 2018
 Campeonato Brasileiro Série B (1): 2022

Regional
 Copa Sul-Minas (2): 2001, 2002
 Copa Centro-Oeste (1): 1999
 Campeonato Mineiro (38): 1928, 1929, 1930, 1940, 1943, 1944, 1945, 1956, 1959,1960, 1961, 1965, 1966, 1967, 1968, 1969, 1972, 1973, 1974, 1975, 1977, 1984, 1987, 1990, 1992, 1994, 1996, 1997, 1998, 2003, 2004, 2006, 2008, 2009, 2011, 2014, 2018, 2019
 Supercampeonato Mineiro (1): 2002

Other
 Copa dos Campeões Mineiros (2): 1991, 1999
 Taça Minas Gerais (5): 1973, 1982, 1983, 1984 e 1985
 Tournament Start (10): 1926, 1927, 1929, 1938, 1940, 1941, 1943, 1944, 1948 e 1966

Trebles and doubles
Trebles
– Domestic Triple Crown
 State, Cup and League: 2003¹

Doubles
– Domestic Double
State and League: 1966
State and Cup: 1996
State and League: 2014
State and Cup: 2018

– Continental Double
 State and Supercopa Sudamericana: 1992
 State and Copa Libertadores: 1997

Other featured campaigns
– Intercontinental Cup
Runners-up (2): 1976, 1997
– Copa Libertadores de América:
Runners-up (2): 1977, 2009
Third place (2): 1967, 1975
– Campeonato Brasileiro Série A:
Runners-up (5): 1969, 1974, 1975, 1998, 2010
Third place (5): 1973, 1989, 1995, 2000, 2008
Fourth place (2): 1968, 2009
– Copa do Brasil
Runners-up (2): 1998, 2014
Semi-finalist (1): 2005, 2016
– Supercopa Sudamericana:
Runners-up (2): 1988 and 1996
– Supercopa Masters:
Runners-up (1): 1992
– Campeonato Mineiro:
Runners-up (30): 1922, 1923, 1924, 1925,1927, 1932, 1933, 1936, 1938, 1950, 1954, 1955, 1962, 1970, 1971, 1976, 1978, 1979, 1980, 1981, 1982, 1983, 1985, 1986, 1988, 1989, 2000, 2005, 2007, 2013, 2017

Grounds and facilities

Cruzeiro's first stadium was the Estádio do Prado Mineiro, which belonged to the Federação Mineira de Futebol (FMF). The club's first game at the stadium was 2–0 win over a Villa Nova/Palmeiras combine team from Nova Lima on 3 April 1921. Cruzeiro would use the stadium until 1923 when the club built its own stadium, Estádio do Barro Preto. On 23 July 1923, Cruzeiro debuted at the stadium in a 2–2 tie with Flamengo. In 1945, the stadium went through renovations and would become at that time the largest stadium in the state with a capacity of 15,000 and later on would become known as Estádio Juscelino Kubitscheck (or Estádio JK). Cruzeiro would use the stadium until 1965, when the Mineirão was opened. In 1983, the stadium was torn down and one of the club's social clubs (Sede Campestre) was built there.

Since 1965, Cruzeiro play their home games at Estádio Governador Magalhães Pinto, often referred to as just Mineirão in Belo Horizonte, MG. Cruzeiro shares the stadium with rivals Atlético Mineiro. The stadium does not belong to Cruzeiro, rather it belongs to the state of Minas Gerais (through a land grant from the Universidade Federal de Minas Gerais) and is administrated by Minas Arena, a private company, on lease from the state since 2013. The stadium, which was built in 1963, had an original capacity of about 130,000, but over the years that capacity has been reduced, and currently it seats 64,800. Named after former Minas Gerais governor José de Magalhães Pinto, it took over 4,000 workers to build the stadium. The period after the stadium's inauguration is often called Era Mineirão ("Mineirão Era"), which saw Cruzeiro gain national and international prominence. Cruzeiro also holds the attendance record at the stadium, when 132,834 spectators watched Cruzeiro beat Villa Nova in the 1997 Campeonato Mineiro final.

Cruzeiro have had plans to build a new stadium, especially under president Alvimar de Oliveira Costa's tenure. However, the state of Minas asked Cruzeiro to stay at the stadium, and after president Zezé Perrella came to the presidency in 2009, plans for a new stadium virtually disappeared.

The Mineirão was selected as a host stadium for the 2014 FIFA World Cup, with renovations beginning on 25 June 2010, and projected to be completed by December 2012. After the stadiums closing, Cruzeiro began playing home games at the Arena do Jacaré and Ipatingão stadiums, both outside the city of Belo Horizonte. Independência stadium is also being renovated and Cruzeiro will start playing homes games there in 2011 until the Mineirão is ready in 2012.

The club has private ownership of other facilities though, including two training facilities (Toca da Raposa I, which serves the youth division and Toca da Raposa II for the senior squad), an administrative headquarters and two social club facilities. Cruzeiro has often been praised for having one of the leading infrastructure systems in Brazil.

Administration and finances

Cruzeiro used to be a nonprofit organization, where the real owner are sócios (literally, "partners") or members (who pay an annual fee), in return, sócios receive benefits from the club, such as access to club's properties and tickets, as well as a right to vote for the next club officials. This bylaw lasted from the club's foundation in 1921 until late 2021, when Wagner Pires de Sá's run as club president led to the club to declare bankruptcy.

Wagner Pires de Sá's run as club president was filled with corruption. This led Cruzeiro to stop paying its players, leading to the club's first relegation in 2019. Over the next two years, Cruzeiro played the second division while still under the sócios program. This changed in December 2021, when the former footballer Ronaldo Fenômeno, who started his professional career in Cruzeiro, announced he would be the owner of Cruzeiro, making Cruzeiro the first Brazilian club with an owner.

See also
 List of Cruzeiro Esporte Clube managers
 List of Cruzeiro Esporte Clube players

Notes

References

External links

 

 Cruzeiro at GloboEsporte 
 Cruzeiro at SuperEsportes 
 Cruzeiro at Placar  
 Cruzeiro at Lancenet 
 Cruzeiro at UOL Esporte 

 
Association football clubs established in 1921
Football clubs in Belo Horizonte
1921 establishments in Brazil
Diaspora football clubs in Brazil
Italian association football clubs outside Italy
Copa Libertadores winning clubs
Recopa Sudamericana winning clubs
Copa do Brasil winning clubs
Campeonato Brasileiro Série A winning clubs